Presidential elections were held in Georgia on 9 April 2000. The result was a victory for Eduard Shevardnadze of the Union of Citizens of Georgia, who received 82% of the vote, with a 76% turnout.

Conduct
The OSCE election observation mission concluded that while "fundamental freedoms were generally respected during the election campaign and candidates were able to express their views [...] further progress is necessary for Georgia to fully meet its commitments as a participating State of the OSCE." The OSCE report also highlighted that only two candidates, Shevardnadze and Patiashvili had "campaigned actively".

Results

References

Presidential elections in Georgia (country)
Presidential
Georgia
Georgia